Robertino Pezzota (born March 10, 1983 in Rosario, Santa Fe) is an Argentinian professional squash player. He reached a career-high world ranking of World No. 76 in June 2015. Pezzota has won four bronze medals at the Pan American Games (2003, 2011, 2015 and 2019).

References

External links 
 
 

1983 births
Living people
Argentine male squash players
Pan American Games bronze medalists for Argentina
Pan American Games medalists in squash
Squash players at the 2003 Pan American Games
Squash players at the 2015 Pan American Games
South American Games silver medalists for Argentina
South American Games bronze medalists for Argentina
South American Games medalists in squash
Sportspeople from Rosario, Santa Fe
Competitors at the 2018 South American Games
Squash players at the 2019 Pan American Games
Medalists at the 2015 Pan American Games
Medalists at the 2019 Pan American Games
Medalists at the 2011 Pan American Games
21st-century Argentine people